Aynur is a Turkish and Azerbaijani given name for females. As it is derived from the Turkish word "ay" and the Arabic word "nur", its literal meaning is moonlight.

Given name 
 Aynur Doğan, Kurdish singer and musician
 Aynur Sofiyeva, Azerbaijani politician and former chess player

Turkish feminine given names